The Skylab Medical Experiment Altitude Test, or SMEAT, was a 56-day simulation of an American Skylab space mission from 26 July-19 September 1972 at NASA's Manned Spacecraft Center in Houston, Texas. The astronauts in the test were Bob Crippen, Karol Bobko, and William Thornton, who simulated space experiments, housekeeping and leisure activities in a hypobaric chamber. SMEAT provided a baseline for the in-orbit portion of biomedical experiments on Skylab.

One of the benefits of SMEAT was discovering flaws in the urine handling system of Skylab, which allowed the problem to be fixed. The Skylab toilet went on to be widely praised by astronauts after the orbital missions.

MSC invited the press in to film the crew entering the chamber. They could not talk to the press as they entered because they were wearing oxygen masks, but they did give a signed photo to one of the press that came out for the event. There were also a number of NASA officials there.

SMEAT's main objective was to evaluate equipment and procedures proposed for use during the Skylab missions. NASA also wanted to obtain a baseline of physiological data for crewmembers confined in a test chamber to compare to the orbiting crews in Skylab living in zero-G. The crew was subjected to a pressure of  bar and 70% oxygen level. Closed-circuit TV provided views of activities inside the chamber.

Roles:
 Commander - Crippen
 Science Pilot - Thornton
 Pilot - Bobko

See also 

 Timeline of longest spaceflights
 Organisms at high altitude
 List of Mars analogs
 Control (science) (Skylab provided baseline data for in-orbit experiments)

References

External links 
 Skylab Medical Experiments Altitude Test (SMEAT) slides

Skylab program
Human analog missions